is a passenger railway station in the city of Matsudo, Chiba, Japan, operated by the third sector Hokusō Railway.

Lines

Station layout
This station consists of two opposed elevated side platforms serving two tracks, with the station building underneath. The station straddles the border between Matsudo and the neighboring city of Ichikawa.

Platforms

Adjacent stations

History
Matsuhidai Station was opened on 31 March 1991. On 17 July 2010 a station numbering system was introduced to the Hokusō Line, with the station designated HS06.

Passenger statistics
In fiscal 2018, the station was used by an average of 5218 passengers daily.

Surrounding area
 Yahashira Cemetery 
 Matsudo Minami Post Office
Mabuchi Motor Company head office

See also
 List of railway stations in Japan

References

External links

  Hokusō Line station information 

Railway stations in Japan opened in 1991
Railway stations in Chiba Prefecture
Hokusō Line
Matsudo